Three of a kind may refer to:

 Three of a kind (poker), a type of poker hand
 Three of a Kind (1967 TV series), a British comedy sketch and music show
 Three of a Kind (1981 TV series), a BBC comedy sketch show
 "Three of a Kind" (The X-Files), a sixth season episode of the television series The X-Files
 Three of a Kind (1925 film), an American silent crime film
 Three of a Kind (1926 film), a film from the Ton of Fun series
 Three of a Kind (1936 film), an American comedy film
 Three of a Kind (1944 film), an American comedy film about two vaudeville acrobats
 Three of a Kind (2004 film), a Hong Kong comedy film
 Three of a Kind (album), a 1998 album by Rob Agerbeek
 3 of a Kind (group), a British garage act